Juhan Sütiste (until 1936 Johannes Schütz; 28 December 1899 Tähtvere Parish, Tartu County – 10 February 1945 Tallinn) was an Estonian poet.

During Estonian War of Independence, he belonged to the reserve battalion of Tartu schoolteachers.

1938–1940, he was the dramaturge for Estonian Drama Theatre in Tallinn.

In 1941, he was mobilized into Tallinn Workers' Regiment.

Works
 Rahutus (poetry collection, 1928)
 Peipsist mereni (poetry collection, 1930)
 Maha rahu (poetry collection, 1932)
 Kaks leeri (poetry collection, 1933)
 Südasuvi (poetry collection, 1934)
 Päikese ootel (poetry collection, 1935)
 Sadamad ja saared (poetry collection, 1936)
 Ringkäik (poetry collection, 1937)
 Kahe sõja vahel (cycle of poetry, 1937–1941)
 Valgus ja varjud (poetry collection, 1939)
 Ristikoerad (play, 1945)

References

1899 births
1945 deaths
Estonian male poets
20th-century Estonian poets
University of Tartu alumni
Estonian military personnel of the Estonian War of Independence
People from Tartu Parish